Kang Eun-hye (born 17 April 1996) is a South Korean handball player for Busan and the South Korean national team.

She participated at the 2017 World Women's Handball Championship.

References

1996 births
Living people
South Korean female handball players
Handball players at the 2018 Asian Games
Asian Games gold medalists for South Korea
Asian Games medalists in handball
Medalists at the 2018 Asian Games
Universiade silver medalists for South Korea
Universiade medalists in handball
Handball players at the 2014 Summer Youth Olympics
Youth Olympic gold medalists for South Korea
Handball players from Seoul
Medalists at the 2015 Summer Universiade
Handball players at the 2020 Summer Olympics
21st-century South Korean women